Singularity Principle is a 2013 American-Canadian-Bahamian-Australian  science fiction film starring William B. Davis, Michael Patrick Denis and John Diehl. The film was produced by Double A Pictures and Salient Clear.  Epcott purchased rights to distribute the file in Japan   The film was originally released in Japan cinemas in March, 2013 and in the United States in October 2013.  The film was shot at the Canadian Light Source synchrotron in Saskatoon, with subsequent segments filmed in the Bahamas and Australia.

Plot 
Academic research scientist Jack Brenner (John Diehl) conducts an unauthorized secret experiment that creates a portal between parallel universes. Jack's protege, Dr. Peter Tanning (Michael Denis), is being questioned by Lawrence Cason (William B. Davis) who works for a clandestine black-ops organization to learn how to reproduce and control the physical process.

Cast 
William B. Davis as Lawrence Cason 
Michael Patrick Denis as Dr. Peter Tanning
John Diehl as Jack Brenner  
Amy LoCicero as Dr. Lori Cason 
Adam Formanek as Tim Sedal 
Darren Toombs as William 'Buck' Townsend

References

External links 

2013 films
English-language Canadian films
Films shot in Saskatchewan
Canadian science fiction films
2013 science fiction films
Films about parallel universes
2010s English-language films
2010s Canadian films